Williamsburg High School may refer to the following secondary schools in the United States:

Williamsburg High School for Architecture and Design in New York City
Williamsburg High School in Williamsburg, Iowa
Williamsburg High School in Williamsburg, Kansas
Williamsburg High School in Williamsburg, Kentucky
Williamsburg High School in Williamsburg, Ohio

See also
Williamsburg-James City County Public Schools